Fabio Torres Silva (born 7 May 1976) is a Colombian Paralympic powerlifter. He won the bronze medal in the men's 97 kg event at the 2020 Summer Paralympics held in Tokyo, Japan.

References

Living people
1976 births
Place of birth missing (living people)
Male powerlifters
Paralympic powerlifters of Colombia
Powerlifters at the 2020 Summer Paralympics
Colombian powerlifters
Medalists at the 2020 Summer Paralympics
Paralympic bronze medalists for Colombia
Paralympic medalists in powerlifting
Medalists at the 2019 Parapan American Games
20th-century Colombian people
21st-century Colombian people